Sebastián de Romero Radigales was a Spanish diplomat, who helped Jews in Greece during the Holocaust. He was born in Graus in the east of Aragon in Spain on 20 January 1884 and died in Madrid, Spain on 31 July 1970. He studied law and during WWII he served as the Spanish consul in Athens. After he died, in 2014 he was awarded the title of Righteous Among the Nations by Yad Vashem.

Early life 
Romero came from a Spanish bourgeois family with a political vocation. His brother was a secretary of state for agriculture and minister in the 1930s with the government of the CEDA. Romero's father was a senator for life.

Romero studied law, but unlike his father and brother Jose and on their recommendation, he chose a diplomatic career and started a journey through different consulates: New York, Tangier, Santiago de Cuba, Belgrade, until 1924. During the dictatorship of General Primo de Rivera, he was appointed consul in Bulgaria. On 23 February 1927, three years later, Sebastián Romero was appointed consul of Spain in Galati, Moldavia (Romania), by King Ferdinand the first of Romania. In Galati he would meet his wife, Elena Cutavá Anino. On 26 August 1929 he was appointed consul in San Francisco by King Alfonso XIII, remaining in this position until 1933. On 12 October 1934 Romero was appointed consul of Chicago.

Romero was a consul in Athens 3 times. The first time was between 1937 and 1938, the second was between 1939 and 1940 and the third time started in April 1943, in the middle of the German occupation of Greece.

Activity during WWII 
As he was Spain's consul in Greece, Romero felt responsibility toward the Sephardi Jews of Greece, and specifically toward the Spanish Sephardi Jews, who are those who held a Spanish passport. He asked for an approval to give those Jews an entry permit to Spain before the Nazis would deal with them themselves. To his surprise the Spanish government was not fond of this idea, but luckily the Germans also preferred for the Spanish Jews to return to Spain, and thanks to Romero's actions the Spanish Jews were assigned to be the last ones to go to Bergen - Belsen's concentration camp.

On 18 March Romero obtained from the Spanish government a list of strict requirements Spanish Jews had to fall into in order to return to Spain. The meaning of these strict requirements was that a very small number of Jews would actually be able to get the entry permit. At this point it was clear to Romero that his views regarding Spanish Jews of Greece were very different from the rest of the Spanish government. Regardless, Romero now had to sign the visas of the Jews who did meet the requirements, and after that the question of how they would actually get to Spain, which proved to be quite complicated.

At first the Spanish government wanted to transport them by sea with Spanish ships, Romero didn't believe this was feasible and suggested that the Spanish Jews would get to Spain with the Swedish's Red cross ships that delivered food to Greece. Sweden agreed but before Spain could carry out this operation, the Germans denied it.

Following negotiations between the Spanish and German governments it was initially decided that the Jews will return to Spain via a train Spain would have to pay for, after Spain didn't agree to that it was decided that the Spanish Jew returning with this train would pay it themselves. A day after Germany officially agreed for this the Spanish government suddenly stepped back from this plan and refused to accept any of its Jewish citizens back.

On 22 July 1943 Romero was informed that the Spanish Jews will be deported to Bergen - Belsen for at least two months, and if Spain will keep not showing any interest in their fate, they will be exterminated. Romero spoke about how terrified and panicked those Jews, who had family in Athens which they now had to leave, were. Romero begged mercy for them and that at least the women, the children, and the ill would be spared. Unfortunately his begging did not yield any results.

without notifying the Spanish government, Romero started to organize with the Italian forces a plan to send Jews from Salonika to Italy or an Italian occupied zone. This infuriated the Spanish government and when Altenberg discovered this plan he immediately ordered Romero to stop and told Germany to not let the Jews go to Athens under any circumstances, even if they won't end up in the camps.

Although he was told not to, Romero continued to attempt to move the Jews to Athens, and thanked Ezra (Spanish Jewish diplomatic representative) Romero made sure that a large amount of Jews will get on a military train to Italy with Italian soldiers that are coming home, so that they will be safe in an Italian occupied zone.

On 2 August 1943 the Salonika Jews with a Spanish nationality were moved to Bergen - Belsen. Romero kept the belongings of the Jews and promised to take care of them. Since not all the Jews that were supposed to be in Salonika were present (because some of them were in Italy illegally) Germany got furious but decided to stay quiet about it to avoid confrontation with Italy.

Italy surrendered to Germany and the Jews of Athena were obligated to register to the Germans and they started a lock-down on the Jews, Romero protested against this but to no avail.

In March 1944 the Germans arrested 3000 Jews out of which 150 had a Spanish citizenship, they were put in Hidary camp next to Athena.

On 11 April 1944 155 Jews with Spanish nationalities and 19 Jews with Portuguese citizenship were sent to Bergen - Belsen concentration camp. Thanks to Romero's efforts and the agreement between Germany and Spain they were moved to a neutral zone. In that area they didn't need to work, thy could wear shoes and had better conditions in general. When The Allies of WW2 got close the Bergen Belsen, the camp got closed following that they sent out 3 trains, the second train had 2700 Jews and was sent out on 6 April 1945, there were Greek Jews,

Jews with Spanish nationalities and Jews with Portuguese nationality.

On 30 September 1944 Romero reported that he took upon himself to aid the Jews in Athena that escaped deportation, he sheltered the Jews in a hotel that a Greek Jew that got deported owned, it was enough for a number of families.

Romero was also in touch with Jews that were hiding, and after 6 of them were found by Germans he debated with the German forces so they wouldn't get deported, eventually they gave up and agreed that the Jews will not get deported but will need to report to a nearby police station on a weekly basis.

On 17 August 1944 the Spanish government informed Romero that he can start planning the moving of 25 Jews at a time to Spain, where another 25 Jews can move only when the previous 25 are not in the country. On 31 August 1944 Romero wrote a letter to the minister of foreign affairs explaining that it is not reasonable to let only 25 Jews get into Spain at a time because that would take 2 years to complete, he then requested to increase the number of Jews at a time, he also requested that the Jews will immediately get a visa upon arrival, both requests were denied.

On 30 September 1944 Spain asked Romero to give them a list of 25 Jews so that they can accept.

In June 1944 Romero tried to move 155 Jews from Bergen Belsen camp to Spain to no avail.

Honors 

 After WWII Romero continued serving General Franco in Athens. On 12 April 1945 he was appointed to different diplomatic roles until he became ambassador in December 1950. He was awarded a diploma by the Greek Red Cross for his service in Greece during the war.
 Romero finished his diplomatic career in Greece, being elected Honorary member of the Parnassus Greek Cultural Association.
 On 18 July 1954 he was awarded the Grand Cross of the Order of Civil Merit. After that he spent his time in the family home “Villa Elena” in Graus (Huesca).
 After his death Romero got awarded the title of Righteous among the Nations. The award was received by his granddaughter in a ceremony which took place at Yad Vashem on 30 September 2014.

See also 
 Spain during World War II 
 Spanish Civil War
 CEDA

References

External links 
 https://www.yadvashem.org/press-release/28-september-2014-10-16.html 
https://righteous.yadvashem.org/?searchType=righteous_only&language=en&itemId=9090804&ind=NaN 
 https://www.raoulwallenberg.net/news/spanish-diplomat-sebastian-de-romero-radigales-is-awarded-the-title-of-righteous-among-the-nations/ 
 https://www.zum.de/whkmla/region/spain/spwwii.html

1884 births
1970 deaths
Spanish Righteous Among the Nations